Charles Thomas Potter (September 21, 1918 – March 1, 1988) was an American jazz double bass player, best known for having been a member of Charlie Parker's "classic quintet", with Miles Davis, between 1947 and 1950.

Born in Philadelphia, Pennsylvania, United States, Potter had first played with Parker in 1944, in Billy Eckstine's band with Dizzy Gillespie, Lucky Thompson and Art Blakey.

Potter also performed and recorded with many other notable jazz musicians, including Earl Hines, Artie Shaw, Bud Powell, Count Basie, Sonny Rollins, Stan Getz, Max Roach, Eddie Heywood, Tyree Glenn, Harry "Sweets" Edison, Buck Clayton and Charles Lloyd.

Discography
 Tommy Potter's Hard Funk, (East-West, 1956)

As sideman
Thelonious Monk and Sonny Rollins (Prestige, 1956) - with Thelonious Monk, Sonny Rollins and Art Taylor
With Gene Ammons
All Star Sessions (Prestige, 1950-55 [1956])
With Al Cohn
Al Cohn's Tones (Savoy, 1950 [1956])
With Tommy Flanagan
The Tommy Flanagan Trio (Moodsville, 1960)
With Jimmy Forrest
Out of the Forrest (Prestige, 1961)
Sit Down and Relax with Jimmy Forrest (Prestige, 1961)
Most Much! (Prestige, 1961)
Soul Street (New Jazz, 1962)
With Stan Getz
Stan Getz Quartets (Prestige, 1949-50 [1955])
The Complete Roost Recordings (Blue Note, 1950–54 [1997])
With Willis Jackson
Please Mr. Jackson (Prestige, 1959)
Cool "Gator" (Prestige, 1959)
Blue Gator (Prestige, 1959)
Together Again! (Prestige, 1959 [1965]) - with Jack McDuff
Together Again, Again (Prestige, 1959 [1966]) - with Jack McDuff
With Jo Jones
Vamp 'til Ready (Everest, 1960)
With Cecil Payne
Patterns of Jazz (Savoy, 1956)
With Freddie Redd
Freddie Redd in Sweden (1956)
With Sonny Stitt
Kaleidoscope (Prestige, 1950 [1957])
Stitt's Bits (Prestige, 1950 [1958])
Stitt in Orbit (Roost, 1962)
With Joe Williams
 Together (Roulette, 1961) with Harry "Sweets" Edison
With Phil Woods
Four Altos (Prestige, 1957) - with Gene Quill, Sahib Shihab and Hal Stein

References

1918 births
1988 deaths
American jazz double-bassists
Male double-bassists
Bebop double-bassists
Musicians from Philadelphia
20th-century American musicians
Jazz musicians from Pennsylvania
20th-century double-bassists
20th-century American male musicians
American male jazz musicians